Sook-ja, also spelled Suk-ja, is a Korean female given name. According to South Korean government data, it was the fifth-most popular name for newborn girls in 1940. The characters used to write this name can also be read as a number of different Japanese female given names, including Yoshiko and Toshiko.

There are 13 hanja with the reading "sook" and 28 hanja with the reading "ja" on the South Korean government's official list of hanja which may be used in given names. Typically, "ja" is written with the hanja meaning "child". It is one of a number of Japanese-style names ending in "ja", like Young-ja and Jeong-ja, that were popular when Korea was under Japanese rule, but declined in popularity afterwards. By 1950 there were no names ending in "ja" in the top ten.

People with this name include:
Kim Sook-ja (1926–1991), South Korean pansori musician
Hong Sook-ja (born 1933), South Korean diplomat and writer
Oh Sook-ja (born 1941), South Korean composer
Shin Suk-ja (born 1942), South Korean prisoner of conscience in North Korea
Yoon Sook-ja (born 1948), South Korean cooking researcher and professor
Lee Sook-ja (born 1980), South Korean volleyball player
Sue Kim Bonifazio, birth name Kim Sook-ja, South Korean-born American singer
Park Suk-ja (born 1970), South Korean athlete

See also
List of Korean given names

References

Korean feminine given names